Jonathan Williams (May 20, 1750May 16, 1815) was an American businessman, military figure, politician and writer. He became Chief of Engineers of the 
Army Corps of Engineers, was the first superintendent of United States Military Academy, and was elected to the Fourteenth United States Congress.

Biography
Williams was born in Boston in the Province of Massachusetts Bay and attended Harvard University. Williams, a grandnephew of Benjamin Franklin, in 1779 married Marianne Alexander, a Scottish girl, daughter of William Alexander a friend of Benjamin Franklin.

His stay in Europe 

He spent most of the period from 1770 to 1785 in England and France. In January 1777, aged 26, at the suggestion of Silas Deane, Jonathan Williams went to Nantes to keep a close eye on Thomas Morris, who had just taken up the post of commercial agent. Williams was also required to inspect shipments of ammunition, uniforms and men, which led him to rent premises and hire staff. He had also "to gather information on all subjects that affect American interests." Many people wanted to do business with the Americans; Williams decided to rely mainly on Jean Peltier Dudoyer, a local shipowner. 
A dispute soon arose. Since France was not officially at war, the Americans asked Peltier Dudoyer to build a ship which, when offshore, would become a corsair. It was the Lion later named Deane. But the atmosphere was detestable, all French landed quickly, including Nicolas Baudin. J. Williams served as arbiter and signed a certificate discharging Peltier Dudoyer. 
 
When Morris died, William Lee was sent to France. He had to review and close the accounts and consider Morris’ replacement. Pending a decision of the Congress, Williams remained in office. This was the beginning of various problems: there are 4 brothers Lee and a nephew Thomas ... Moreover, Deane departed for the United States and was replaced by John Adams, who did not speak French and began to question Williams’ achievements. 
 
The resale of the Drake, seized by John Paul Jones, caused difficulties: J. Williams sold the ship to Schweighauser, a shipowner from Nantes, while American Captain NcNeil wanted to buy it. Finally, after an agreement, the Drake was resold to Peltier Dudoyer "on behalf of Mr. de Monthieu" on November 20, 1778. 
 
The dispute between J. Williams and the Lee family, was settled by a duel in Lorient, June 18, 1779. On that day, Williams, allegedly drunk, insulted Thomas Lee. They met in a room, fired at each other and both fortunately missed.

His return to the United States 

Back in the United States, he joined the American Philosophical Society in 1787 and published articles on scientific subjects.

President John Adams appointed Williams a major in the Corps of Artillerists and Engineers in February 1801. President Thomas Jefferson upon approval made him the Army's Inspector of Fortifications and assigned him to serve as the first superintendent of West Point in December 1801. The following year Jefferson also appointed him to concurrently command the separate Corps of Engineers established by the Military Peace Establishment Act and Congress and signed by Jefferson on March 16, 1802. He vacated (not resigned) his Superintendent position in 1803 but was reappointed in 1805.

In 1802, the investor Richard Woodhull purchased  in north Brooklyn and named the area Williamsburgh (later changed to Williamsburg), after Williams, who surveyed the land.

From 1807 to 1811 Williams designed and completed construction of Castle Williams (the East Battery) and Castle Clinton (the West Battery) in New York Harbor.  Castle Williams was the first casemated battery in the United States. He founded the U.S. Military Philosophical Society and gave it its motto, "Science in War is the Guarantee of Peace."

He resigned from the Army in July 1812 because the Secretary of War, William Eustis, refused to give him command of Castle Williams, a fortification that he designed and was named after him. At that time, New York State placed him in charge of construction of fortifications for New York City. He eventually returned to Philadelphia and headed a group of volunteer engineers building fortifications around the city when he was elected to the Fourteenth United States Congress from that city in 1814. He died of gout in Philadelphia before the Congress assembled.

He was originally buried in Pine Street Cemetery between 4th and 5th Streets in Philadelphia and was re-interred in Laurel Hill Cemetery in 1862.

See also

List of United States Congress members who died in office (1790–1899)
United States Army Corps of Engineers

References

This article contains public domain text from 

Tugdual de Langlais, L'armateur préféré de Beaumarchais Jean Peltier Dudoyer, de Nantes à l'Isle de France, Éd. Coiffard, 2015, 340 p.. 
The Political Graveyard

External links
US Army Corps of Engineers – brief biography

Superintendents of the United States Military Academy
United States Army Corps of Engineers Chiefs of Engineers
American merchants
American people of English descent
American science writers
1750 births
1815 deaths
Harvard University alumni
Democratic-Republican Party members of the United States House of Representatives from Pennsylvania
United States Army colonels
Members of the American Philosophical Society